Quercus bicolor, the swamp white oak, is a North American species of medium-sized trees in the beech family. It is a common element of America's north central and northeastern mixed forests. It can survive in a variety of habitats. It forms hybrids with bur oak where they occur together in the wild.

Description 
The bark resembles that of the white oak. In autumn, they turn brown, yellow-brown, or sometimes reddish, but generally, the color is not as reliable or as brilliant as the white oak can be. The fruit is a peduncled acorn, rarely , long and  broad, maturing about six months after pollination.

Swamp white oak may live up to 300 years.

Distribution and habitat 
Swamp white oak, a lowland tree, occurs across the eastern and central United States and eastern and central Canada, from Maine to South Carolina, west as far as Ontario, Minnesota, and Tennessee with a few isolated populations in Nebraska and Alabama. This species is most common and reaches its largest size in western New York and northern Ohio.

The swamp white oak generally occurs singly in four different forest types: black ash–American elm–red maple, silver maple–American elm, bur oak, and pin oak–sweetgum. Occasionally the swamp white oak is abundant in small areas. The frost-free period ranges from 210 days in the southern part of the growing area to 120 days in the northern part. The swamp white oak typically grows on hydromorphic soils. It is not found where flooding is permanent, although it is usually found in broad stream valleys, low-lying fields, and the margins of lakes, ponds, or sloughs. It occupies roughly the same ecological niche as pin oak, which seldom lives longer than 100 years, but is not nearly as abundant.

Uses 
It is one of the more important white oaks for lumber production. The wood is similar to that of Q. alba and is not differentiated from it in the lumber trade. In recent years, the swamp white oak has become a popular landscaping tree due to its relative ease of transplanting.

Being in the white oak group, wildlife such as deer, bears, turkeys, ducks, and geese as well as other animals are attracted to this tree when acorns are dropping in the fall.

Cultivars 
A mix of Quercus robur fastigiata x Quercus bicolor, named 'Nadler' or the Kindred Spirit hybrid oak, exists.

References

External links 
Quercus bicolor images from Vanderbilt University
photo of herbarium specimen at Missouri Botanical Garden, collected in Missouri in 1934

bicolor
Trees of Eastern Canada
Trees of the Eastern United States
Trees of the North-Central United States
Trees of the Northeastern United States
Trees of humid continental climate
Plants described in 1801
Taxa named by Carl Ludwig Willdenow